The Boyd River, part of the Gordon River catchment, is a perennial river located in the south western region of Tasmania, Australia.

Course and features
The Boyd River rises in the Sentinel Range below Mount Wedge and flows generally north and reaches its confluence with the Wedge River within the now-flooded Lake Gordon. The river descends  over its  course.

See also

 Rivers of Tasmania

References

Gordon River, Tasmania